Sigma Psi Zeta Sorority, Inc., also known as Sigmas or SYZ, is a progressive multicultural American sorority. It was founded on March 23, 1994, at the University at Albany and incorporated in New York on March 15, 1996. It is the third-largest Asian-interest sorority in the nation. It is a part of the National APIDA Panhellenic Association (NAPA).

History 
Plans for the Sigma Psi Zeta sorority were formed in the fall semester of 1993 at SUNY Albany by a group of female undergraduates from different backgrounds. The sorority was formed in part to address the dual difficulties faced by Asian women. Its founding mothers were Gina Han, Sally Hsieh, Jean Kim, Jenny Kim, Sandra Lam, Winnie Liu, Yan-Chieh Liu, Michelle Macaraig, Sung-Yon Noh, and Loan Trang.

On March 23, 1994, the sorority was officially recognized by the university. Within a year, a second chapter was formed at SUNY University at Binghamton. The sorority was incorporated in New York on March 15, 1996.

Internally, the sorority uses the term "womxn" instead of "woman" or "women". Similarly, it uses "sxsters" or "syzters" in place of "sisters". Similar terminology has been adopted by other multicultural organizations.

Symbols 
The sorority's colors are red and gold and its flower is a yellow rose with baby's breath. Its motto is "Lead from the front."

Activities 
Sigma Psi Zeta is a cultural, social, educational, and community service–oriented Greek organization. Its philanthropic focus is to combat violence against women in its various forms. Sigma Psi Zeta is an official partner of the White House initiative, It's On Us, which launched as a result of the ARC3 Survey.

Since 1999, Sigma Psi Zeta's philanthropy has been to combat violence against women. The sorority has worked against violence against women in many forms and has focused specifically on Asian women who are historically objectified and disempowered. Local chapters and colonies participate in events such as the Take Back The Night rallies and the National Coalition Against Domestic Violence's Domestic Violence Awareness month.

Membership 
Sigma Psi Zeta has 43 active chapters in the states/commonwealths of California, Colorado, Connecticut, Illinois, Kansas, Maryland, Massachusetts, Michigan, Minnesota, Nebraska, New Jersey, New York, Pennsylvania, Virginia, Washington, Washington D.C., and Wisconsin.

Chapters 
Following are the chapters of Sigma Psi Zeta. The sorority differentiates between three levels of organization at its campus units. Chapter status appears to be the ultimate goal. Newer or emerging groups are called charters. The third type is denoted as Interest Groups; an interest group must have permission to form from campus administration and must include at least ten members.  

Active groups are listed here in bold, inactive groups are listed in italics.

Notes

References 

Student societies in the United States
Asian-American culture in New York (state)
Asian-American fraternities and sororities
Student organizations established in 1994
1994 establishments in New York (state)